The Da-Qing Tongbi (Traditional Chinese: 大清銅幣), or the Tai-Ching-Ti-Kuo copper coin, refers to a series of copper machine-struck coins from the Qing dynasty produced from 1906 (Guangxu 31) until the fall of the Qing dynasty in 1911. These coins were intended to replace the earlier cast cash coins and provincial coinages, but were welcomed to mixed receptions.

Two series of Tongyuan (銅元) were simultaneously in circulation, one carried the inscription Guangxu Yuanbao (光緒元寶), which was also used for silver coins, and the other with the inscription Da-Qing Tongbi. While the Guangxu Yuanbao were often provincially issued and at first were of different weights, the Da-Qing Tongbi was introduced by the imperial government in the hope of creating a unified national currency system.

Name 

The name "Da-Qing Tongbi" (大清銅幣) can be translated as "Copper currency of the Great Qing" and was used to indicate that this series was supposed to be the standard coinage of the entire empire as opposed to provincial coinages.

The Qing dynasty had a bimetallic coinage system, and similar titles were also used for other standardised metal coinages such as the silver Da-Qing Yinbi (大清銀幣) and the gold Da-Qing Jinbi (大清金幣).

History 

Due to a shortage of copper at the end of the Qing dynasty, the mint of Guangzhou, Guangdong, began striking round copper coins without square holes in June 1900. They were called Tóngyuán or Tóngbǎn and they were struck in denominations of 1, 2, 5, 10, 20, and 30 wén. These struck coins were well received because of their higher quality compared to cast coins and their convenience in carriage, as well as their uniform weight and copper content compared to the less consistent alloys of cast Chinese coinage. As these coins were profitable to manufacture it did not take long before other provinces started making machine-struck cash coins too, and soon 20 bureaus were opened across China. As these coins became more common, they eventually replaced the old cast coins as the main medium of exchange for small purchases among the Chinese people. The first of these provincial machine-struck copper-alloy coins had the inscription Guangxu Yuanbao (光緒元寶) and a weight of 7.46 grams. These early Cantonese milled coinage were inspired by copper coins from British Hong Kong. Due to the success of these Cantonese milled coins, the government of the province of Fujian started minting their own version of this coin in August 1900.

From the year 1901, the provinces of Jiangsu, Hubei, Anhui, Zhejiang, Fengtian, Hunan, Beiyang Zhili, Sichuan, Jiangxi, Jilin, Shandong, Henan, Guangxi, and Yunnan had all begun to manufacture milled copper-alloy coins and distributed them nationwide. They became so popular that by the 31st year of the Guangxu Emperor (1906) they were being produced at 15 different bureaus in 12 provinces.

The government of the Qing dynasty established a modern coin factory at the Ministry of Revenue Mint (formerly the "Tianjin Silver Money General Mint") in Tianjin in the year 1903 and the mint began to produce milled copper-alloy coins in 1905. At the same time, the government of the Qing dynasty ordered the entire country to produce the Da-Qing Tongbi coins to replace the former "Guangxu Yuanbao" and unified and standardised national currency system. The government of the Qing dynasty hoped to regain control of its currency system in order to also get more control over its own internal affairs. In the year 1906, the Ministry of Revenue had issued the "Regulations on the Rectification Law" (整頓圜法章程), and had merged 24 mints around China into only 9.

The Da-Qing Tongbi coins were initially issued in the denominations of 2 wén, 5 wén, 10 wén, and 20 wén with each of these denominations being based on their nominal value in traditional cash coins. The government of the Qing dynasty had produced an excessive amount of 10 wén Da-Qing Tongbi coins. In the year 1909, the government of the Qing dynasty had ordered the mints to suspend the production of the 10 wén copper coins and produce a smaller denomination brass coin to ease the pressure of the 10 wén Da-Qing Tongbi coins, but only the provincial mints of Hubei, Jiangning, and Henan complied. The government of the Qing dynasty had issued a new law on currency known as the "Currency Regulations" (幣制則例) in the year 1910 to regulate and standardise the entire Chinese national currency system. In the year 1911, the government of the Qing dynasty had issued the "Xuantong third year" series of copper-alloy coins, but these did not comply with the earlier set national regulations for coinages in China.

Design 

The designs of the Da-Qing Tongbi coins are similar to that of the Guangxu Yuanbao coins, the inscription Da-Qing Tongbi written in large Traditional Chinese characters occupied the centre part of the obverse side of the coin. In the very centre of the coin, between the Da-Qing Tongbi characters, were one or two small Chinese characters indicating the provincial mint where the coin was manufactured.

Near the top of the rim of the coin, the inscription Da-Qing Tongbi was again written down, but this time it was written using the Manchu script, as Manchu was the language of the ruling class of the Qing dynasty. Near the right and left sides of the outer rim were two characters representing the "Ministry of the Interior and Finance", which was later replaced by the "Ministry of Revenue and Expenditure" (戶部). At the bottom, the 10 wén Da-Qing Tongbi coins contained the inscription "文十錢制當" ("Worth 10 wén in standard cash coins") written from right to left indicating its nominal value.

The reverse side of the Da-Qing Tongbi coin, like the Guangxu Yuanbao provincial coinages, also had the design of a Chinese dragon on it, but these dragons have much fewer variations in comparison to those on the Guangxu Yuanbao milled coins because of the imperial government's efforts in standardising designs. Near the upper part of the outer rim were the Traditional Chinese characters Guangxu Nianzao (造年緒光) written from right to left, which could be translated into English as "minted during the Guangxu years". Near the lower part of the outer rim was the text, written in English, "Tai-Ching-Ti-Kuo Copper Coin". Machine-struck Da-Qing Tongbi coins would continue to be produced during the reign of the Xuantong Emperor. The Da-Qing Tongbi coins of this period had the text Xuantong Nianzao (造年統宣) written from right to left, meaning "minted during the Xuantong years", inscribed near the upper part of the outer rim on the reverse side of the coins to indicate the era of mintage.

Mint marks

Years

Denominations

Contemporary counterfeit Da-Qing Tongbi coins 

Not long after these new copper coins were introduced, black market counterfeit versions of the 10 wén appeared and illegal mints or "private mints" (局私) opened all over China and started producing more coins than what the Qing government's set quotas allowed on the market. Both Chinese and foreigners soon started producing struck cash coins of inferior quality, often with traces of the Korean 5 fun coins they were overstruck on, or with characters and symbols not found on official government issued coins. Joseon began minting modern-style machine-struck copper-alloy coins in 1892, which was 8 years before the Qing dynasty did so in China. These coins were often minted by Korean businessmen and former Japanese Samurai (specifically Rōnin) looking to make a profit on exchanging the low value copper coins into silver dollars as a single Chinese silver dollar had the purchasing power of 1000 Korean fun. The majority of the counterfeit coins bear the inscription that they were minted in either Zhejiang province or Shandong province, but they circulated all over the coastal regions of China. Because the hand-operated presses used by the counterfeiters did not exert enough pressure on the coins to sufficiently obliterate the inscriptions and symbols on the Korean 5 fun coins, the counterfeit Qing dynasty 10 wén coins made using this method would usually exhibit a combination of both the Chinese Da-Qing Tongbi and Korean 5 fun designs. For example, there can still be traces of a wreath surrounding the dragon or minor traces of the original Korean inscription.

Notes

References

Sources 

 Dai Zhiqiang (戴志強), ed. (2008). Zhongguo qianbi shoucang jianshang quanji (中國錢幣收藏鑒賞全集) (Changchun: Jilin chuban jituan). (in Mandarin Chinese). 
 Nei Menggu qianbi yanjiu hui (內蒙古錢幣研究會), Zhongguo qianbi bianjibu (《中國錢幣》編輯部), ed. (1992); Cai Mingxin 蔡明信 (transl.). Zhongguo guchao tuji (Beijing: Zhongguo jinrong chubanshe). (in Mandarin Chinese).  
 Peng Xinwei (彭信威) (1954 [2007]). Zhongguo huobi shi (中國貨幣史) (Shanghai: Qunlian chubanshe), 580–581, 597–605. (in Mandarin Chinese).  
 Xie Tianyu (謝天宇), ed. (2005). Zhongguo qianbi shoucang yu jianshang quanshu (中國錢幣收藏與鑒賞全書) (Tianjin: Tianjin guji chubanshe), Vol. 2, 508. (in Mandarin Chinese).  
 Zhou Fazeng (周發增), Chen Longtao (陳隆濤), Qi Jixiang (齊吉祥), ed. (1998). Zhongguo gudai zhengzhi zhidu shi cidian (中國古代政治制度史辭典) (Beijing: Shoudu shifan daxue chubanshe), 372, 375, 380, 381, 382. (in Mandarin Chinese).

External links 

 Daqingtongbi.com, a website dedicated to these coins. (in Mandarin Chinese)

 

Coins of China
Economy of the Qing dynasty
Chinese numismatics